The Tom Wheatcroft Trophy has been awarded annually since 2002 in recognition of a person who has made significant contributions to the motorsport world and industry. It was founded by Kevin Wheatcroft in commemoration of his father Tom Wheatcroft, a lifelong motorsport enthusiast, team owner, constructor, the owner of Donington Park motor racing circuit and the Donington Grand Prix Collection.

The trophy is a representation of a steering wheel mounted on a Grand Prix car driven by Roger Williamson who was Tom Wheatcroft's protégé in the early 1970s.

The award winners are:
 2002 - Murray Walker
 2003 - Professor Sid Watkins
 2004 - Jean Todt
 2005 - Bernie Ecclestone
 2006 - Professor Jürgen Hubbert of Mercedes Benz
 2007 - Sir Stirling Moss
 2008 - Sir Frank Williams
 2009
 2010 - Rick Hall 
 2011 - David Richards, chairman of Aston Martin

Tom Wheatcroft Memorial Trophy
Every year since 2010, the Donington Park Racing Association Club has presented a tall silver cup trophy in memory of Tom Wheatcroft, the Tom Wheatcroft Memorial Trophy. It is presented alternately to bikes and cars:
 2010	Kevin Wheatcroft
 2011	Marco Melandri, World Superbikes
 2012	Olivier Pla, Bertand Baguette and Dimitrie Enjalbert, European Le Mans Series
 2013	Alex Lowes, British Superbike Championship
 2014	Jason Plato, British Touring Car Championship
 2015	James Ellison, British Superbike Championship

References

Awards established in 2002
Motorsport in the United Kingdom
Auto racing trophies and awards